= Shooting at the 2010 South American Games – Men's skeet =

The Men's skeet event at the 2010 South American Games was held on March 25 and March 26.

== Individual ==
=== Medalists ===
Gold	Silver	Bronze
Fernando Luis Gazzotti; Argentina	Khalid Metwasi; Peru	Marco Rodolfo Walker; Peru

=== Results ===
==== Qualification ====
Rank	Athlete	Series					Total	Shoot-off
Rank	Athlete	1	2	3	4	5	Total	Shoot-off
1	Khalid Metwasi (PER)	24	23	25	24	24	120	
2	Fernando Luis Gazzotti (ARG)	24	24	23	24	24	119	
3	Marco Rodolfo Walker (PER)	23	24	25	24	21	117	
4	Bonifacio de Raadt (CHI)	23	23	22	23	24	115	
5	Renato Portela (BRA)	24	21	22	24	22	113	
5	Marcelo Yamal Jadue (CHI)	22	25	23	24	19	113	
7	Vicente D'Ambrosio (COL)	21	21	23	24	22	111	
8	Luciano Alves (BRA)	20	22	23	22	22	109	
9	Horacio Pedro Gil (ARG)	21	21	22	21	23	108	
10	Juan Fernando Arango (COL)	20	18	21	21	20	100	

==== Final ====
Rank	Athlete	Qual Score	Final Score	Total	Shoot-off
1st place, gold medalist(s)	Fernando Luis Gazzotti (ARG)	119	24	143	
2nd place, silver medalist(s)	Khalid Metwasi (PER)	120	20	140	
3rd place, bronze medalist(s)	Marco Rodolfo Walker (PER)	117	22	139	2
4	Bonifacio de Raadt (CHI)	115	24	139	1
5	Marcelo Yamal Jadue (CHI)	113	24	'137	
6	Renato Potela (BRA)	113	23	136	

== Team ==
=== Medalists ===
Gold	Silver	Bronze
Khalid Metwasi; Marco Rodolfo Walker; Peru	Bonifacio de Raadt; Marcelo Yamal Jadue; Chile	Fernando Luis Gazzotti; Horacio Pedro Gil; Argentina

=== Results ===
Rank	Athlete	Series					Total
Rank	Athlete	1	2	3	4	5	Total
1st place, gold medalist(s)	Peru						237
1st place, gold medalist(s)	Khalid Metwasi (PER)	24	23	25	24	24	120
1st place, gold medalist(s)	Marco Rodolfo Walker (PER)	23	24	25	24	21	117
2nd place, silver medalist(s)	Chile						228
2nd place, silver medalist(s)	Bonifacio de Raadt (CHI)	23	23	22	23	24	115
2nd place, silver medalist(s)	Marcelo Yamal Jadue (CHI)	22	25	23	24	19	113
3rd place, bronze medalist(s)	Argentina						227
3rd place, bronze medalist(s)	Fernando Luis Gazzotti (ARG)	24	24	23	24	24	119
3rd place, bronze medalist(s)	Horacio Pedro Gil (ARG)	21	21	22	21	23	108
4	Brazil						222
4	Renato Portela (BRA)	24	21	22	24	22	113
4	Luciano Alves (BRA)	20	22	23	22	22	109
5	Colombia						211
5	Vicente D'Ambrosio (COL)	21	21	23	24	22	111
5	Juan Fernando Arango (COL)	20	18	21	21	20	100
